Agdistis morini is a moth in the family Pterophoridae that is endemic to  Italy.

References

Agdistinae
Endemic fauna of Italy
Moths described in 2001
Moths of Europe